The halfmoon triggerfish, Sufflamen chrysopterum, is a triggerfish of the tropical Indo-West Pacific area.

The halfmoon triggerfish lives around seaward reefs and shallow lagoons. It is solitary and is often found around coral looking for small invertebrates, like crustaceans and worms, on which it feeds.

The halfmoon picassofish species is often also named halfmoon triggerfish.

References

External links
 

Balistidae
Taxa named by Marcus Elieser Bloch
Taxa named by Johann Gottlob Theaenus Schneider
Fish described in 1801